The Mount Yangtai also known as Mount Yangtai Forest Park, is a mountain at the junction of Bao'an District and Nanshan District in Shenzhen, Guangdong, China. In 2008 The mount is rated as one of the eight scenic spots of Shenzhen by the Shenzhen government.

History
During the Second Sino-Japanese War, the local people and Dongjiang Column rescued many cultural celebrities, including Mao Dun, He Xiangning, and Zou Taofen.

Geography

Mount Yangtai abounds with secondary south subtropical rain forest and monsoon evergreen broad-leaved forest.

Climate

Streams
Rivers with headwaters on the mountain include: Shiyan Stream, Baimang Stream and Mashan Stream.

Reservoirs
Shiyan Reservoir, Xili Reservoir, Tiegang Reservoir, Gaofeng Reservoir, and Laiwushan Reservoir are located at the foot of Mount Yangtai.

Transportation
 Take bus No. 101,226,104,M203,240,B796 from Nanshan District to Xili Lake Station
 Take bus No. 332, 624, 882, or m233 from Longhua Bus Station to Yangtaishan Station

References

External links

Parks in Shenzhen
Tourist attractions in Shenzhen
Mountains of Shenzhen
Bao'an District
Nanshan District, Shenzhen